Kenneth Stern may refer to:

 Kenneth S. Stern, American defense attorney and author
 Kenneth Stern (rugby union) (born 1988), Filipino-American rugby union player
 Ken Stern, former chief executive officer of National Public Radio